Charles Huerta (born August 7, 1986) is an American professional boxer.

Professional career
On July 23, 2010 Huerta stopped veteran Jonathan Arias by knockout in the sixth round, the fight was shown on Telefutura.

References

External links

American boxers of Mexican descent
Boxers from California
Featherweight boxers
1986 births
Living people
American male boxers
People from Paramount, California